Walter Godfrey Jaoko is a Kenyan professor of medical microbiology and tropical medicine. He is the director of Kenya AIDS Vaccine Initiative (KAVI) and a professor at University of Nairobi, University of Alabama and Stellenbosch University.

Birth and education 
Jaoko was born in 1961. He obtained his Medical Degree from University of Nairobi in 1986. In 1993, he received his master's degree in Tropical medicine from the University of Liverpool. In 1996, he bagged a diploma in Research Methodology from the University of Copenhagen. He obtained his doctorate medical microbiology in 2001 from the University of Nairobi and a post graduate diploma in Health Research Ethics (cum laude) from Stellenbosch University in 2014.

Career

Academics 
Jaoko became an assistant lecturer at the department of Medical Microbiology, University of Nairobi in 1989, a full lecturer in 1993, a senior lecturer in 1998, the chair of the department of Medical Microbiology in 2005, an associate professor in 2007 and a professor in 2011. In 2008, he became an Adjunct Assistant Professor at the School of Public Health, Department of Epidemiology, University of Alabama and in 2016 he became Extraordinary Professor in Medicine at Department of Internal Medicine Stellenbosch University.

KAVI – Institute of Clinical Research (KAVI-ICR) 
Jaoko was an honorary consultant and a clinical manager/senior trial physician at KAVI in 2001. He became the principal investigator for several studies in 2002, the deputy director in 2013 and he is currently the director of the organisation.

Research interests 
Jaoko worked on infectious diseases transmission, treatment, control in order to understand the risk factors for HIV transmission, HIV superinfection and preventive HIV vaccine. Recently, he has focused on the use of monoclonal antibodies for the prevention of HIV transmission. He is also working on  research and development of second generation of COVID-19 preventive vaccines.

Fellowships and memberships 
In 1989, Jaoko became a member of the Kenya Medical Association and a member of Medical Practitioners and Dentists board. In 2013, he became a member of International Society of Travel Medicine and a member of Royal Society of Tropical Medicine & Hygiene. In 2014, he became a member of African Academy of Sciences.

Selected publications 

 Long JE, Waruguru G, Yuhas K, Wilson KS, Masese LN, Wanje G, Kinuthia J, Jaoko W, McClelland RS, Mandaliya K (2019). Prevalence and predictors of unmet contraceptive need in HIV-positive female sex workers in Mombasa, Kenya. PLoS One (in print)
 Chepchirchir A, Nyagol J & Jaoko W (2019). Cytokine expression and hypertension comorbidity in HIV/AIDS patients at Kenyatta National Hospital HIV Care Centre, Nairobi, Kenya. International Journal of Cardiovasular Research 2018; 7:2
 Perciani CT, Jaoko W, Farah B, Ostrowski MA, Anzala O, MacDonald KS; KAVI-ICR Team (2018). αEβ7, α4β7 and α4β1 integrin contributions to T cell distribution in blood, cervix and rectal tissues: Potential implications for HIV transmission. PLoS One 13(2): e0192482
 Masiye, F, Jaoko, W, Rennie, S. Stakeholder views on informed consent models for future use of biological samples in Malawi and South Africa. BMC Med Ethics. 2023;24 (1):4. doi: 10.1186/s12910-023-00882-4. PubMed PMID 36658544 PubMed Central PMC9854061

References 

1961 births
Kenyan academics
University of Nairobi alumni
Academic staff of the University of Nairobi
University of Liverpool
University of Copenhagen alumni
Stellenbosch University alumni
Living people